Made in Japan is a live album by English hard rock band Whitesnake. It was recorded at Saitama Super Arena in Saitama, Saitama during the Loud Park Festival. It was released on 3 April 2013 in Japan, 19 April in Europe 22 April UK and 23 April in the US.

The album was released as a Blu-ray, a single DVD set, a 2CD/DVD digipack.

Track listings

Personnel

Whitesnake
David Coverdale - lead vocals
Doug Aldrich - guitar, backing vocals
Reb Beach - guitar, backing vocals
Michael Devin - bass, backing vocals
Brian Tichy - drums, backing vocals

Guest musicians
Brian Ruedy - keyboards, backing vocals

Charts

References

2013 live albums
2013 video albums
Live video albums
Whitesnake live albums
Albums recorded at Saitama Super Arena
Whitesnake video albums
Frontiers Records video albums
Frontiers Records live albums
Live hard rock albums
Live heavy metal albums